Krum Stoyanov (born 1 August 1991) is a Bulgarian footballer who plays as a defender for Etar Veliko Tarnovo.

Career
Stoyanov made his A Group debut for Chernomorets Burgas on 24 March 2012 against Vidima-Rakovski Sevlievo.

On 18 June 2015, Stoyanov joined Lokomotiv Plovdiv. He was in the regular starting lineup and played as left back in 27 league games during the 2015-16 season.

Botev Plovdiv
On 16 June 2016, Stoyanov made a surprising and controversial move to Lokomotiv's bitter rivals Botev Plovdiv.

On 7 April 2017, he scored his first goal for Botev during the 7-1 win over Montana and received the award for man of the match.

Dinamo Minsk
Krum Stoyanov joined Dinamo Minsk in December 2017 but never took part in any official matches, playing only for the "B" team. He was released in June 2018.

Etar
On 18 June 2018, Stoyanov signed a 2-year contract with Etar.

Arda
In April 2021, he became part of the Arda Kardzhali team.

CSKA 1948
In September 2021, Stoyanov joined CSKA 1948.

Etar
In July 2022 he agreed terms with Etar Veliko Tarnovo.

Honours
Botev Plovdiv
Bulgarian Cup: 2016–17
Bulgarian Supercup: 2017

References

External links
 
 

1991 births
Living people
Sportspeople from Sliven
Bulgarian footballers
FC Pomorie players
PFC Chernomorets Burgas players
PFC Slavia Sofia players
PFC Lokomotiv Plovdiv players
Botev Plovdiv players
FC Dinamo Minsk players
SFC Etar Veliko Tarnovo players
PFC Beroe Stara Zagora players
First Professional Football League (Bulgaria) players
Second Professional Football League (Bulgaria) players
Belarusian Premier League players
Bulgarian expatriate footballers
Expatriate footballers in Belarus
Bulgarian expatriate sportspeople in Belarus
Association football fullbacks
Association football wingers